Opah, Texas is a ghost town located in Red River County, Texas. The town was situated on the Red River north of Clarksville, Texas. Founded sometime in the 19th century, the town caved into the river in 1910.

References

Towns in Red River County, Texas
Towns in Texas